
Ulrich Wöhnert (24 October 1914 – 14 August 1947) was a Luftwaffe ace and recipient of the Knight's Cross of the Iron Cross during World War II. The Knight's Cross of the Iron Cross was awarded to recognise extreme battlefield bravery or successful military leadership. During his career he was credited with 86 aerial victories, all over the Eastern Front.

Awards

 Knight's Cross of the Iron Cross on 6 December 1944 as Leutnant and Flugzeugführer (pilot) in the 5./Jagdgeschwader 54

References

Citations

Bibliography

 
 
 
 
 

1914 births
1947 deaths
People from East Prussia
People from Kętrzyn County
German World War II flying aces
Recipients of the Gold German Cross
Recipients of the Knight's Cross of the Iron Cross
Luftwaffe pilots